Tambov is a city in Russia.

Tambov may also refer to:

Tambov Oblast, a Russian province
4621 Tambov, a main-belt asteroid
Tambov (air base), a Russian Air Force base
, a Soviet merchant ship in service 1946-58
Tambov Gang, an organized crime outfit based in St. Petersburg, Russia